Ballyrobert railway station served the village of Ballyrobert in County Antrim, Northern Ireland.

History

The station was opened by the Belfast and Ballymena Railway on 1 July 1905.

The station was comparatively short-lived, and closed to passengers on 1 June 1920.

References 

Disused railway stations in County Antrim
Railway stations opened in 1848
Railway stations closed in 1954

Railway stations in Northern Ireland opened in 1848